Christy Doran (born 1949) is a jazz guitarist born in Dublin, Ireland, and raised in Lucerne, Switzerland.

Doran founded OM with Fredy Studer, Urs Leimgruber, and Bobby Burri in the 1970s; this ensemble recorded for ECM. He and Studer also worked on a Jimi Hendrix tribute project in the 1990s. Doran has worked with free jazz and avant-garde jazz musicians such as Marty Ehrlich, Robert Dick, Ray Anderson, Han Bennink, Albert Mangelsdorff, Louis Sclavis, Marilyn Mazur, Herb Robertson, John Wolf Brennan, Jamaaladeen Tacuma, Phil Minton, Joe McPhee and  Carla Bley. Doran founded New Bag in 1997 and toured the world from 1998 to 2000 with the ensemble. Doran has taught at the Musikhochschule Luzern since 1990.

Discography

As leader
 Harsh Romantics (1984)
 Christy Doran's May 84 (1985)
 The Returning Dream of the Leaving Ship (1986)
 Red Twist & Tuned Arrow (ECM, 1987)
 Henceforward (1988)
 Christy Doran's Phoenix (hatArt, 1989)
 Corporate Art (JMT, 1991)
 What a Band (Hathut, 1991)
 Musik für zwei Kontrabässe, elektrische Gitarre und Schlagzeug (1991) (ECM)
 Play the Music of Jimi Hendrix (Intuition, 1995)
 Race the Time (1997)
 Shaman (2000)
 Black Box (2002)
 Heaven Is Back in the Streets (Double Moon, 2003)
 Triangulation (Leo, 2004)
 Confusing the Spirits (2004)
 Perspectives (Between the Lines, 2005)
 Jimi (Challenge, 2005)
 La Fourmi (2005)
 Now's the Time (2006)
 The Competence of the Irregular (Between the Lines, 2009)
 Triangulation: Whirligigs (Leo, 2010)

Collaborations 

 No. 9 (Leo, 2013) with Yang Jing
 Christy Doran's Sound Fountain – Belle Epoque (Between the Lines, 2016)
 Call Me Helium (Double Moon, 2016) with Jamaaladeen Tacuma, Fredy Studer, Erika Stucky
 Kontaktchemie (Boomslang Records, 2016) with Alfred Vogel

As sideman 
With Ray Anderson and Han Bennink
 Azurety (hat ART, 1994)
 Cheer Up (hat ART, 1995)

With Joe McPhee
Linear B (Hat Hut, 1990)

References

External links
 
 [ Christy Doran] at Allmusic
 

1949 births
Living people
ECM Records artists
Irish jazz guitarists
Swiss jazz musicians
Irish emigrants to Switzerland